Saurauia scabrida is a species of plant in the Actinidiaceae family. It is endemic to Mexico.

References

Endemic flora of Mexico
scabrida
Least concern plants
Taxonomy articles created by Polbot
Trees of Mexico
Cloud forest flora of Mexico